The 1978–79 Northern Premier League was the eleventh season of the Northern Premier League, a regional football league in Northern England, the northern areas of the Midlands and North Wales. The season began on 19 August 1978 and concluded on 21 May 1979.

Overview
The League featured twenty-three clubs.

Team changes
The following two clubs left the League at the end of the previous season:
Wigan Athletic promoted to Football League Fourth Division
Great Harwood folded

The following club joined the League at the start of the season:
Southport demoted from Football League Fourth Division

League table

Results

Stadia and locations

Cup results

Challenge Cup

Northern Premier League Shield

Between Champions of NPL Premier Division and Winners of the NPL Cup.
As Mossley won both the Northern Premier League and the Challenge Cup, Altrincham qualified as 2nd placed team of the NPL.

FA Cup

Only two of the twenty-four Northern Premier League clubs reached the second round:

Second Round

Third Round

FA Trophy

Two of the twenty-four Northern Premier League clubs reached the fourth round:

Fourth Round

Semi-finals

Final

End of the season
At the end of the eleventh season of the Northern Premier League, Altrincham who was put forward for election did not receive enough votes to be promoted to the Football League.

The Alliance Premier League was established as a new, national top division of non-League football. Seven Northern Premier League clubs and thirteen clubs from the Premier Division of the Southern League joined the newly created Alliance Premier League. The remaining clubs in the Northern Premier League had effectively been relegated down one tier in the English football league system.

Football League elections
Alongside the four Football League clubs facing re-election, two non-League clubs, one from the Northern Premier League and the other from the Southern League, applied to be elected.  All four Football League clubs were re-elected.

Promotion and relegation
The number of clubs reduced from twenty-three to twenty-two for the following season.

The following seven clubs left the league at the end of the season:
Altrincham promoted to Alliance Premier League
Bangor City promoted to Alliance Premier League
Barrow promoted to Alliance Premier League
Boston United promoted to Alliance Premier League
Northwich Victoria promoted to Alliance Premier League
Scarborough promoted to Alliance Premier League
Stafford Rangers promoted to Alliance Premier League

The following six clubs joined the league the following season:
Burton Albion promoted from Southern League Division One North
Grantham promoted from Southern League Division One North
Marine promoted from Cheshire County League Division One
Oswestry Town promoted from Southern League Division One North
Tamworth promoted from Southern League Division One North
Witton Albion promoted from Cheshire County League Division One

References

External links
 Northern Premier League official website
 Northern Premier League tables at RSSSF
 Football Club History Database

Northern Premier League seasons
5